San Martín Municipality may refer to:
 San Martín, Cesar
 San Martín, Meta

Municipality name disambiguation pages